Sons of Butcher is a Canadian rock band consisting of three members, two of whom are brothers. Their music fuses vulgar absurdist comedy with rock music in a style that is described as "mock rock". Their band alter-egos are the focus of an animated television series developed by S&S Productions and aired on Canadian animation network Teletoon. Several of the band's songs were included in the soundtrack for the 2007 film Pigs, along with a cameo by Trevor Ziebarth.

History

In 2004 Sons of Butcher began performing live in Hamilton, Ontario for small but appreciative crowds. Their blend of comedy, rock and deli trays quickly became a local sensation.

After the completion of their second TV season, the Sons of Butcher live act hit the road for a full 22 show East to West Canadian tour, reaching from Halifax, NS to Nanaimo, BC. The tour culminated in a sold-out performance at the Mod Club in Toronto, Ontario - which was recorded for broadcast. The concert was released as a 90-minute live special called "Sons of Butcher: Tourin' the Canada". It featured a mixture of live skits filmed across Canada and live performances from the Toronto show. The special aired May 18, 2007, on Teletoon in Canada. The entire, unedited performance was released digitally as a live album entitled "Moppin' The Mod Club: Live In Toronto" on February 14, 2019 through Infamous Butcher Records. It is available on all digital streaming services worldwide.

Discography

Albums
 Sons of Butcher (2005)
 Left Behind Volume One (2005)
 Meatlantis (2006)
 Left Behind Volume Two (2006)
 Rise of the Steaks (2010)
 Fall of the Steaks (2010)
 C Sections (2016)
 Lockdown In Steeltown (2020)

Songs
Many of the songs from their first and second albums along with all the unreleased songs have been featured at some point in an episode of the Sons of Butcher animated series.

Sons Of Butcher:
 "Decapitation"
 "Love in the Raw"
 "Cherry Thief"
 "(Dream) Girl Dream (Lady)"
 "Fuck the Shit"
 "In Thru the Outhole"
 "I Hate Girlfriends"
 "Pump Me Up"
 "Punch That Face"
 "Rockload"
 "We Fuckin' Rule"
 "Prayers"

Left Behind Volume One:
 "SOB Theme"
 "SOB Story"
 "The Gentle Art of Butchery 2"
 "Tit Song"
 "Cheeseburgs"
 "Becomin' a Butcher"
 "Helpin' the Community"
 "Hate Triangle"
 "Tapeworm"
 "'Nsane Dream"
 "Tenderize Me"
 "Bacon Shakes"
 "Epiphany in the Key of Bigfoot"
 "The Gentle Art" (Original)
 "Escape Ants"
 "Lick Me Up"
 "Low Carb Treat"
 "Butcher of the Month"
 "In the Cellar"
 "Salon Tech"
 "Rum Cruise"
 "S'verybody Someone"
 "Prayers for Fishies"
 "Bigfoot Rap"
 "Bacon Shakes (Reprise)"
 "New Wave Them"

Meatlantis:
 "Meatlantis"
 "Action Reaction"
 "Here to Rock"
 "Party's On"
 "Love Baster"
 "Made Love By the River"
 "I Need An Arm"
 "Whip'em Out"
 "F the World"
 "Fuck Producers"
 "Panty Dropper"
 "Doug in Space"
 "Suite: Bad Touch"
 "Free Shit"
 "Ultimate Drinking Song"
 "Sneakin' in"
 "Razors"
 "Meatlantis Reprise"

Left Behind Volume Two:
 "Arpo's House of Death"
 "Chicken Fever"
 "Come Fight Me"
 "Crazy Toenails"
 "Dear John"
 "Dirtbike"
 "Don't Egg Me"
 "Feed the Snake"
 "Fukt Country"
 "Funky Drummer Carol"
 "Go Vegan"
 "Heavy Duty (Look At That)"
 "How Will Doug Die?"
 "I Kill Everything"
 "Jaco: Portrait of a Kicked Ass"
 "Why Must I Bleed"
 "My Cow Son"
 "Pineapple Breaks"
 "Playin' High"
 "Publicity Rocket 3.0"
 "Publicity Rocket 4.0"
 "Punch You With a Knife"
 "Rashmen"
 "Rock Rash"
 "Scalpin' Interrogation"
 "Scalpin'"
 "Slaughterhouse Blues"
 "The Lord VS Rock"
 "The Message"
 "The Plan"
 "Trainin' Jerry"
 "Trainin' the Robot"
 "Until it Bleeds"
 "Until it Rains"
 "Warehouse Party"
 "Wolfback Laceration"
 "Workin' the Line"

Rise of the Steaks: 
 "Rise of the Steaks"
 "The Cougar"
 "U.S.F.A"
 "Weed in that Brownie"
 "Underage Party"
 "Balls of Blue"
 "How it's Long"
 "Eat it Out"
 "Burgers and Drinks"
 "Puke all Night"
 "Burnin' Skoolhaus"
 "Fuck the Shit *Re-Mastered"

Fall of the Steaks:
 "Fall of the Steaks"
 "The Antimosher"
 "Spring Break!"
 "High Class Feel"
 "Leather and Lace"
 "Mr.Borski's Opus"
 "Safe Sex Sucks"
 "Call of the Bush Ape"
 "Giant Tits"
 "Four Cocks"
 "The Steeltown Scene"
 "Pembroke Skies"
 "Eat it out (David's Wet Rub)"

C Sections:
 "A Bigger Catapult"
 "Beef & The Chicken"
 "The Summer Of '16"
 "The Deepest Crush"
 "One Night In Bangkok"
 "Rock God"
 "Honkeytonk Daddy"
 "Hand To Gland Combat"
 "Palm Loin Armigiana"
 "Lick Me Up"
 "The Ending Story"

Unreleased songs:
 "Gold"
 "Lion Tech"
 "Loverechaun"
 "Birthday Tree"

Current members
 Ricky Butcher (Trevor Ziebarth) – guitar, Lead vocal (Current member)
 Sol Butcher (Dave Dunham) – guitar, lead vocal
 Doug Borski (Jay Ziebarth) – bass guitar, vocals (Current member)
 Sausage Ralph (Daryl Ralph)– drums(2019-Current)
 Christal Ballz (Chris Bell) –  drums (live) (2005–2007, 2021-)
 Pat Mugger (Tony Jacome) –  drums (live) (2008–2021)
 Bingo (Mitch Bowden) – roadie (2006-)
 DallWok (Matt Kates) – lead triangle (2007-)

Side Projects

Moonlight Desires

Moonlight Desires is a Sons of Butcher side project named after the well-known Gowan song of the same name. Spinning off from Sons of Butcher's tendency to play 80s covers in their live show which quickly became crowd favourites, Moonlight Desires was formed in late 2013 with the mandate of exclusively turning 80's pop songs into heavy rock tunes. The first album Frankie Goes to Hamilton was released independently in the summer of 2014. The second album Just The Hits: 1981-1985 was released on September 21, 2017. It was named the #15 Best Canadian Metal Album of 2017 on Hellbound.ca, had many positive critical reviews, and was the first frontline release for Trevor Ziebarth's record label Infamous Butcher Records.

Band Members - LIVE
 Trevor Ziebarth - vocals, guitar
 Jay Ziebarth - bass guitar / vocals
 Daryl Ralph - drums
 Marco Bressette - guitar
 Nicholas Daleo - guitar

Band Members - Recording
 Dave Dunham - drums
 Nicholas Daleo - bass guitar
 Marco Bressette - leads

References

External links
 "Fuck the Shit" Music Video

Canadian rock music groups
Canadian comedy musical groups
Musical groups established in 2004
Musical groups from Hamilton, Ontario
Comedy rock musical groups
2004 establishments in Ontario